Fear on Trial is a 1975 American television film about the blacklisting of John Henry Faulk. It was directed by Lamont Johnson.

Cast

References

External links

1975 television films
1975 films
American television films
American films based on actual events
Films directed by Lamont Johnson